Ihab El-Lebedy (born 8 September 1957) is an Egyptian modern pentathlete. He competed at the 1984 Summer Olympics, finishing in 33rd place in the individual event.

References

1957 births
Living people
Egyptian male modern pentathletes
Olympic modern pentathletes of Egypt
Modern pentathletes at the 1984 Summer Olympics